Stephanie Beckert  (born 30 May 1988) is a long-distance speed skater from Germany. She had a fourth place standing at the 2008–09 women's 3000/5000 m World Cup. At the 2010 Winter Olympics she won one gold and two silver medals.

Her mother Angela and five younger brothers and sisters all did speed skating, and one of the brothers, Patrick, competed at the 2010 Olympics. Her father Detlef is a retired handball player. Stephanie first trained in figure skating, but at the age of 10 switched to speed skating. Since October 2006 Beckert is serving in the German Army and has a rank of sergeant.

References

External links

 Personal website
 Stephanie Beckert at SpeedSkatingNews.info
 
 
 

1988 births
German female speed skaters
Speed skaters at the 2010 Winter Olympics
Speed skaters at the 2014 Winter Olympics
Olympic speed skaters of Germany
Medalists at the 2010 Winter Olympics
Olympic medalists in speed skating
Olympic gold medalists for Germany
Olympic silver medalists for Germany
Sportspeople from Erfurt
Living people
World Single Distances Speed Skating Championships medalists